Aaron Cannings (born 26 October 1981) is a New Zealand former professional rugby league footballer who played in the 2000s and 2010s, as a . He played for the Northern Eagles, Manly-Warringah Sea Eagles, Parramatta Eels and the Gold Coast Titans in the National Rugby League, and for the Tweed Heads Seagulls in the 2011 Queensland Cup.

Playing career
Cannings made his first grade debut for the Northern Eagles in Round 16 2002 against Melbourne.  At the end of 2002, the Northern Eagles were dissolved and reverted to Manly-Warringah.  Cannings played 1 season with Manly before joining Parramatta.

In 2005, Cannings made 13 appearances as Parramatta won the minor premiership but he did not feature in the finals series for the club.  Cannings missed the entire 2006 season but returned in 2007 playing 21 games for Parramatta as they finished 5th on the table.

In 2008, Cannings joined Gold Coast and spent 3 years at the club before retiring at the end of 2010.

Personal life
Cannings was born in Auckland, New Zealand with Australian and Cook Island heritage. He lived in country towns Cobar and Wee Waa before moving to Sydney to start his career in Rugby league. Cannings currently works in the financial industry.

References

External links
Gold Coast Titans Profile
Gold Coast profile

1981 births
Living people
New Zealand rugby league players
New Zealand sportspeople of Cook Island descent
New Zealand sportspeople of Tongan descent
Gold Coast Titans players
Manly Warringah Sea Eagles players
Northern Eagles players
Parramatta Eels players
Rugby league players from Auckland
Rugby league props
Tonga national rugby league team players
Tweed Heads Seagulls players